The Traitors is an Australian reality television series broadcast on Network 10, based on the Dutch series De Verraders, which premiered on 16 October 2022.

Following the premise of other versions of De Verraders, the show features a group of contestants participating in a game similar to the party game Mafia - In which a small group of contestants become the Titular "Traitors", and must work together to eliminate the others contestants order to win a grand prize, while the remaining contestants become "Faithful" and are tasked to discover and banish the Traitors by voting them out, in order to win the grand prize. 

The first season aired in late 2022. Although the series is not formally renewed, the casting application is open for a potential second season.

Format
24 strangers arrive at an old hotel in the Southern Highlands as "Faithful" contestants – hoping to share a prize fund worth up to A$250,000. Amongst them are the "Traitors" – a group of four contestants selected by host Rodger Corser on the first day, whose goal is to eliminate the Faithfuls and claim the prize for themselves. Should the Faithful contestants eliminate all the Traitors, they will share the prize fund. If a Traitor makes it to the end, they steal the money.

Each night, the Traitors come together and decide upon one Faithful contestant to "murder" – and that person will leave the game immediately. The remaining Faithful contestants will not know who has been eliminated until the following day when they will not arrive for breakfast. The group then take part in a mission to win money for the prize fund and, in some episodes, also participate in a Shield challenge to win individual player immunity from elimination (both from Murder & Banishment). 

At the end of each day, the group will participate in the Banishment Ceremony - where the players discuss who to vote out before individually voting for a player to banish. where the players discuss who to vote out before individually voting for a player to be banished. Players cast their votes privately before revealing their vote in turn to everyone. The person obtaining the most votes is banished from the game and must reveal their affiliation. 

Occasionally, twists will impact how the game is played - most notably with Traitors being given opportunities to recruit new Traitors among Faithful players.

Contestants

Voting history

Key
  The contestant was a Faithful.
  The contestant was a Traitor.
  The contestant was ineligible to vote.
  The contestant was on Death Row at this Banishment Ceremony.
  The contestant was immune at this Banishment and the subsequent Murder Ceremony (as applicable).

Notes

Ratings

International Broadcast
In the United States, the show is available to stream on Peacock, the broadcaster of the American version.

References

External links
 
 Production website

Network 10 original programming
2022 Australian television series debuts
2020s Australian reality television series
2020s Australian game shows
2022 Australian television seasons
Television shows filmed in Australia
Television shows set in New South Wales
Australian television series based on Dutch television series
English-language television shows
Television series by Endemol Australia